

Summary

Dressage
An NOC may enter 3 athletes if they qualified for the team competition. The quota places for top ranked riders in the geographic groups must go to riders from nations without a qualified team. The additional individual qualifying spots are based on the FEI Ranking and can go to any NOC, up to a maximum of 4 riders. If a team obtains 3 individual quota places, it may also be allowed to enter the team competition.

Team

Individual

* New Zealand withdrew its team and decided to nominate only two individual riders. As a result, Poland qualified a third individual rider and was admitted into the team competition. New Zealand later withdrew one of those individual quotas allowing Finland to qualify.

** No riders from the Colombian team reached the minimum qualification standard, so three individual quota places were added.

*** No riders from Antigua and Barbuda reached the minimum qualification standard, so one individual quota place was added.

Eventing
An NOC may enter up to 5 athletes if they qualified for the team competition. Individual qualification quota places may only go to nations without a qualified team, up to a maximum of 5. Should an NOC obtain 3 or more quota places in this manner, it may be allowed to participate in the team competition. The Netherlands, Australia and Ireland have qualified a team by this route.

Team

Individual

* Argentina withdrew its team.

Jumping
An NOC may enter up to 4 athletes if they qualified for the team competition. Individual qualification quota places may only go to nations without a qualified team, up to a maximum of 2.

Team

Individual

References

Qualification for the 2012 Summer Olympics
Qualification